This is a list of all captains of the Hawthorn Football Club, an Australian rules football club in the Australian Football League Mens and AFL Women's.

VFA/VFL/AFL

AFL Women's

References

Hawthorn Football Club Honour Board

Hawthorn
Captains
Melbourne sport-related lists